The Juxing Pagoda is a Chinese pagoda located in Nancheng County, Jiangxi, China. It lies on the top of Mount Wugang and on the east bank of Xu River. In 2013 it has been listed as among the seventh group of "Major National Historical and Cultural Sites in Jiangxi" by the State Council of China.

History

Ming dynasty
According to Nanchang County Annals, the pagoda was built as Qiming by magistrate Hu Mingzuo in 1614 during the reign of Wanli Emperor in the late Ming dynasty (1368–1644). "Qiming" means to hope for the prosperity and prosperity of the Ming Empire. In 1638, the pagoda was slightly damaged by lightning.

Qing dynasty
In 1645, in the 2nd year of Shunzhi period of the Qing dynasty (1644–1911), a disastrous fire consumed the pagoda. In 1662, in the period of the Kangxi Emperor, magistrate Gao Tianjue renovated and refurbished it. Due to the social taboo of "Ming" (Ming or Daming means the former Ming dynasty), its name was changed to "Shuangjiang". In 1754, during the Qianlong era, magistrate Yao Wenguang supervised the restoration and renamed it "Juxing".

Modern China
In December 1987, it has been designated as a provincial level cultural heritage by the Jiangxi Provincial Government.

The pagoda became dilapidated for neglect. In 1992, the restoration project was launched and was completed in October of the following year.

In 2013, it inscribed to the seventh batch of "List of Major National Historical and Cultural Sites in Jiangxi" by the State Council of China.

Architecture
The  pagoda was octagonal with seven stories. It is made of bricks.

References

Pagodas in China
Buildings and structures completed in 1614
Ming dynasty architecture
Major National Historical and Cultural Sites in Jiangxi
1614 establishments in China